Hasan Gavdari (also Romanized as Ḩasan Gāvdārī; also known as Ḩasan) is a village in Zangvan Rural District, Karezan District, Sirvan County, Ilam Province, Iran. At the 2006 census, its population was 432, in 94 families. The village is populated by Lurs.

References 

Populated places in Sirvan County
Luri settlements in Ilam Province